Distrigidius apicalis is a species of beetles in the family Carabidae, the only species in the genus Distrigidius.

References

Pterostichinae
Monotypic Carabidae genera